This list of protected areas of Manitoba groups the protected areas of Manitoba by the agency that is responsible for their protection.

National Protected Areas

Two national parks, overseen by Parks Canada, have been established within Manitoba:
Riding Mountain National Park
Wapusk National Park 
Riding Mountain National Park forms the core of the Riding Mountain Biosphere Reserve (RMBR), a UNESCO World Biosphere Reserve.

Provincial Protected Areas

Manitoba has 92 provincial parks. The provincial government has also established more than 50 protected areas under the Provincial Parks Act, overseen by Manitoba Conservation and Climate. This legislation provides for parks to be dedicated for three purposes:

The legislation distinguishes several types of park: Wilderness, Natural, Recreation, and Heritage. Land being considered for inclusion in a Provincial Park may be designated as a 'park reserve' for a limited period of time.

Other legislation provides the government with additional opportunities to set aside areas of the province for special protection
 The Forest Act includes the ability to establish provincial forests.
 The Ecological Reserves Act includes the ability to establish ecological reserves. 
 The Wildlife Act includes the ability to establish Wildlife Management Areas (WMA)
 The East Side Traditional Lands Planning and Special Protected Areas Act, which governs the traditional use for the area east of Lake Winnipeg.

There is also a series of lands privately owned by three conservation agencies that are part of the provincial protected areas network.

Regional/urban parks 
There are several large regional parks in the City of Winnipeg, which are the responsibility of the municipal Department of Public Works.

See also
List of Canadian provincial parks
List of National Parks of Canada

References

External links
 
 
 Government of Manitoba Parks and Protected Spaces Branch

Manitoba
Protected areas